Jadranko "Jadran" Vujačić (born 27 December 1959) is a Montenegrin professional basketball coach and former player.

Playing career 
A center, Vujačić played for Partizan, Budućnost, Olimpija, Sloboda DITA, Borac Banja Luka, Borac Čačak, and Makedonija 91. He won three FIBA Korać Cup tournaments with Partizan. Vujačić retired as a player with Makedonija 91 in 1998.

National team career 
Vujačić was a member of the Yugoslavia national team that won the gold medal at the 1983 Mediterranean Games in Morocco.

Coaching career 
After retirement in 1998, Vujačić founded the Joker Basketball Academy in his hometown Podgorica, Montenegro. Professional basketball players such as Nikola Mirotić and Marko Todorović started to play basketball there.

References

External links 
 Coach Profile at treneri.me

1959 births
Living people
Centers (basketball)
Competitors at the 1983 Mediterranean Games
KK Budućnost players
KK Borac Banja Luka players
KK Borac Čačak players
KK Olimpija players
KK Partizan players
KK Sloboda Tuzla players
Mediterranean Games gold medalists for Yugoslavia
Mediterranean Games medalists in basketball
Montenegrin basketball coaches
Montenegrin expatriate basketball people in Serbia
Montenegrin men's basketball players
Sportspeople from Podgorica
Yugoslav men's basketball players